Subak is an ancient martial art that originated in Korea and uses bare-hand techniques. The term was also used in Korea to refer to any fighting style that used bare  hands. It is a different fighting style from Soo Bahk Do, which is a modern martial art with the same pronunciation but a different spelling.

In Korea, each region had its own style of Subak; today, only two styles remain.

One is taught purely as Subak, from the lineage of Song Chang Ryul (宋昌烈) (1932-2017).

The other has been absorbed into modern Taekkyeon by Master Shin Han Seung. When Master Shin Han Seung tried to resurrect Taekkyeon after the Korean war, he sought instruction from the Taekkyeon master, Song Dok Ki, and, the Subak master Il Dong. Shin Han Seung then combined Taekkyeon and Subak.

Subak misconceptions
A common misunderstanding is that Subak only involves slaps with the palm and features 45-degree side attacks to the cheeks, face, neck, or body; there are several reasons why: 
 Korea went through social changes during the Japanese occupation of Korea. Many traditional beliefs and practices are either disconnected or reinterpreted compared to the historical teachings of scholars in previous generations. 
 By the 1900s, Subak had fallen into obscurity in Korea. There is no direct link between historical practitioners and today's modern students.
 The etymology of the word Subak is contested. Although the word means "clap" in Old Korean, this strict definition is used to support the claim that martial art should be confined to only palm strikes or side-hitting.
 Subyuk, another historical Korean martial art, only uses slaps with palms.

In reality, historically Subak used punches whether as a real-life application. Even Subyuk had the historical nickname "fist", which is corroborated in archive records.

Today, the Korean Subak Federation (Daehan-subak-hyeobhoe/대한수박협회) is operated by North Korea. (North Korea's Songdo still had Subak even until recently although Subak was extinct in the rest of Korea.) They still teach Subak even today; they teach frontal slaps (slapping front) and punches. As a corroboration, Subak Dance, Taekkyeon, and Subyuk also have frontal slaps. Subak Dance is a valuable historical record that recorded Subak's moves as a dance including slapping dance partner's chest. Subak Dance has been passed down in Manchuria & North Korea. All those sports and activities corroborate the same details about Subak.

Subak's motions
According to "Chosun Common Sense Q & A", which was Namseon Choi's 1937 newspaper column, "Subak & Subyuk were the same, a fighting game which became a drinking game,  children's game. The method is fast grab moving front & back. The hand & fingers bend."

In 1964, the ethnologist, Gimu Hong, representing the North Korean Science Center Anthropology & Ethnology Research Institute, published the book, "There was a game called Subak. This knocks down the opponent with punches. Subak was liked by warriors in that era."

Medieval Chinese book, Yongdangsopoom, recorded Subak using another term, "Tagwon", in 1621. It also indicated that Subak included Suburb techniques. "백타(白打)는 곧 수박으로 겨루는 것이다. 당나라 장종(莊宗)은 수박으로 내기를 하였으며, 장경아(張敬兒)는 수박으로 공을 세웠다. 세속에서는 타권(打拳)이라고도 하며, 소주인이 말하길 사람의 뼈를 부러 뜨려 죽음에 이르게 할 수 있다. 빨리 죽이고 천천히 죽이는 것은 오로지 수법(手法)에 달려 있다." Translation: "Baekta is competing with Subak. Tang's Jangjong gambled with Subak. Jang Gyunga made accomplishments with Subak. Civilians also call Subak as Takwon. Soju people say it can break human's bones to kill. Killing fast or killing slow depends on the (Subeob) techniques." There are also reputable archaeological Subak wall drawings (including frontal slaps) which represent the real life Subak scenes back in the era.

Medieval Korean Royal Journal also describes the rules & motions of Takwon. "유격이 타권의 기법을 앞에서 보여줬다. 그 법은 뛰면서 몸을 날려 두 손으로 자기 얼굴이나 목, 혹은 등을 치며, 가슴과 배를 번갈아치기도 했다. 볼기와 허벅지를 문지르기도 하며, 손을 쓰는 것이 어찌나 빠르고 민첩한지 사람이 감히 그 앞에 접근할 수 없을 정도였다(선조실록 권99, 31년 4월 경신)". Translation: "Yugyeok showed Tagwon's techniques at the front. The method is leaping the body, with 2 hands, hitting his face, neck & back, hitting chest & stomach. Also rubbing butt & thighs. His hand strikes were fast & agile that a person couldn't go near his front." Subak Dance also shows the dance performer slapping his body as well as slapping an opponent's (dance partner's) body such as slapping his chest (frontal slap to the opponent's chest).

Also, Subyukta (which came from Subak, according to medieval encyclopedia, Jaemulbo) uses palms only because it is convenient for gaming and practicing purposes. However, that does not define Subak's full technique. Subyuk is a part of Subak, and not the entire Subak. Subak has frontal slaps like Subyuk which has the nickname Sonbbyukchigi (clap strike); Subak also has punches unlike Subyuk although corroborated by Subyuk's another nickname Ken (fist).

Subak used punches, unlike Subyuk, which only used frontal slaps & side slaps. Also, even Subyuk had nicknames like Clap Strike (Sonbbyukchigi) & Fist (Ken). "SYOU-PYEK-TCHI-KI - HAND-CLAPPING", "It is usually played to the accompaniment of songs, and receives the name of Ken (Chinese, K'un), 'fist.'", "The hands are then clapped, and opened, palms out, to strike those of the other player".

History
Historically, Subak may refer to the old Korean martial art of taekkyeon, but historians are still uncertain, since little is known about it. It is acknowledged, however, that Subak flourished during the Yi dynasty. During the Yi dynasty, a book was published to teach the game as a martial art. Since then, Subak has contributed to the evolution of Korean martial arts, which has also included the yusul.

By the 18th century, the king practiced Subak, as the text Dongsa-gangmok (동사강목) from this time suggests:

At this point, Subak was not only considered martial art but was also practiced as an organized sport that was staged as a form of spectator entertainment.

The word Seonbae (also romanized as sonbae, literally: "elders" - 先輩/선배) is sometimes translated to mean "a man of virtue who never retreats from a fight", and was used to signify a member of Koguryo's warrior corps. Members of the Seonbae lived in groups and learned archery, Gakju (ancestor of ssireum) and Subak (ancestor of taekkyon), history, literature, and other liberal arts. Although they were constantly training in combat, during peacetime they committed to relief periods, such as by helping construct roads and fortresses and assist after natural disasters.

Split
Subak took a heavy blow during the Joseon period, which was founded on the ideology of Confucianism, stressing literary art over martial art. Subak was only allowed to be practiced in competitions called subakhui. After three consecutively successful subakhui bouts, only then could the winner become employed as a soldier.

During the beginning of the Joseon dynasty, Subak became Taekkyeon. Yusul (meaning "soft art") and Taekkyeon both share "yusul" movements.

Subak is suspected to be the same art as Taekkyeon with a different name. Yusul [유술/柔術] is written with the same Hanja as Jujutsu and since 柔 means "soft/pliable/yielding" any yusul techniques would naturally "redirect" an opponent's force rather than meet it head-on. Kwonsul [권술/拳術], is the contrasting term, and although it means "fist technique" it no doubt included strikes made with the feet as well as the hands. Taekkyeon 택견 was a term regarded more in line with a game or idle training methodology, whereas kwonsul [권술/拳術] or kwonbeop [권법/拳法] was the terminology usually associated with hand-to-hand fighting techniques. A similar argument could be made regarding ssireum [씨름] (a game) and japgi [잡기] (grappling skills).

Subak Dance (Subakchoom)
Traditional Subak had become a dance; it has passed down in Manchuria. The following Subak moves in the Subak Dance are from Daehansubakhyubhoi (Korean Subak Federation). "기본틀; 수박치기 - 손바닥 치고 손등 치기, 가슴치고 손등치기, 제몸치기(이마, 뺨, 어깨, 옆구리, 허벅, 발바닥), 상대 몸치기, 날개펴기, 무릎 세우기". Translation: "Basic framework; Subak strikes - hit palm then the back of the hand, slap chest then back of the hand, hit your body (forehead, cheek, shoulder, waist, thigh, foot), hit the opponent's (dance partner's) body, open wings, raise the knee". "마무리; 어깨치기에 들어막기로 응수하고 양손 떼밀기하다가 옆구리치기에 무릎 세우기로 방어한다. 가슴치기에 슬쯕대어 피하고 이어서 상대허리를 감아 들고 힘있게 꺽듯이 하다가 엉덩방아를 찧게 한다. 다른 예도 있다." Translation: "Last; slap the opponent's shoulder to be corresponded by raising blocking, push the opponent with both hands, slap the opponent's waist to block by raising the knee to defend. Slap the opponent's chest to be dodged by swaying. Followed by wrapping the opponent's waist with arms, powerfully bend it then let him fall on his ass. There are other cases." 

Subak Dance shows Subak, including slapping a dance partner's chest (frontal slap) as well as dodging it. Subak Dance has moves such as slapping his body particularly the forehead, cheeks, chest, shoulders, thighs, feet (frontal slaps & side slaps), and also slapping the dance partner's body in the same manner. This dance is also popular in North Korea but was extinct in South Korea until recently. There is also the motions of making fists in the dance, consistent with the Subak rules historically corroborated by many authorities of Korean sports history. Manchuria's Subak Dance is the ancient Subak made into a dance. Subak Dance is passed down by Manchuria Koreans and North Korea today. It's recognized & certified by the Chinese government as a traditional culture officially. Subak Dance's authenticity is corroborated by its widespread contents (Manchuria & North Korea) as well as its history (Subak Dance was seen 100 years ago). In Subak Dance, when hitting his forehead & chest (as well as hitting a dance partner's body), frontal slaps are shown.

"일제강점기의 반도의 舞姬, 최승희여사(1911 ~ 1969. 8. 8)도 手拍舞를 무대에서 공연한 적이 있다하며 그의 저서인 "조선족 무용기본동작(1978)"중에 수박치기가 포함되어 있다." Translation: "During the Japanese occupation of Korea, Seungheui Choi (1911 ~ 1969. 8. 8) also has performed Subak Dance in her stage. Her book "Korean Chinese Basic Dance Motions" (1978) includes Subak strikes." Subak Dance also has fist motions although slapping is more convenient for practicing, dancing, and gaming. "손동작; 손목 꺽기, 손가락 꼬기, 손목 흔들기, 주먹쥐고 앞, 뒤로 흔들기". Translation: "Hand motions; bending wrist, crossing fingers, shaking wrists, making fist then rocking it front & back".

Subak having frontal slaps
Subak has punches. Subyuk (originated from Subak) has straight slaps. Also, ancient Kokuryeo's Subak wall drawings show frontal slaps. Kokuryeo had a limited number of sports; those reputable archaeological wall drawings can only be matched with few sports including Subak; Subak has a limited number of motions which can be matched with the pictures by the process of elimination.

Subak had a swing slap hitting front or side (can do both by choice, by different curves); Subak also had straight slaps like Chinese Iron Palm breaking layers of cinder blocks with a straight slap 100 years ago (photographed); Subak also had punches. It's arguable whether Subak had all those from the beginning of the sport or evolved in the ancient time eventually, but Subak had them anyway visible already in the ancient & medieval eras. Subak's motions are proven with ancient pictures, medieval writings, Subak Dance (Subakchoom corroborates Subak's moves & rules), Taekkyeon, etc. Subak Dance & Taekkyeon have punches, frontal swing slaps, straight slaps, and side (cheek) slaps.

Even in Subak Dance which represents the old Subak, frontal slaps exist. "마무리; 어깨치기에 들어막기로 응수하고 양손 떼밀기하다가 옆구리치기에 무릎 세우기로 방어한다. 가슴치기에 슬쯕대어 피하고 이어서 상대허리를 감아 들고 힘있게 꺽듯이 하다가 엉덩방아를 찧게 한다. 다른 예도 있다." Translation: "Last; slap the opponent's shoulder to be corresponded by raising blocking, push the opponent with both hands, slap the opponent's waist to block by raising the knee to defend. Slap the opponent's chest to be dodged by swaying. Followed by wrapping the opponent's waist with arms, powerfully bend it then let him fall on his ass. There are other cases." Subak Dance shows Subak, including slapping a dance partner's chest (frontal slap) as well as dodging it.

Relationship between Subak, Korean wrestling (Ssireum), Subyukta (Subyukchigi, Sonbbyukchigi)
Also, Subyukta (which came from Subak according to medieval encyclopedia Jaemulbo) uses palms only when practicing. That doesn't necessarily mean Subak also should be slapping with palm only. Subyuk is a part of Subak; it's not the entire Subak; Subak has frontal slaps like Subyuk which has the nickname Sonbbyukchigi (clap strike); Subak also has punches unlike Subyuk although corroborated by Subyuk's another nickname Ken (fist). There's no explicit proof that dictates Subak's rules from Subyuk's motions. (Subyuk came out of Subak.) Subak & Subyuk are separate games although related; Subak had punch unlike Subyuk which only had frontal slaps & side slaps. Also, even Subyuk had nicknames like Clap Strike (Sonbbyukchigi) & Fist (Ken). "SYOU-PYEK-TCHI-KI - HAND-CLAPPING", "It is usually played to the accompaniment of songs, and receives the name of Ken (Chinese, K'un), 'fist.'", "The hands are then clapped, and opened, palms out, to strike those of the other player".

As for the relationship between Korean wrestling (Ssireum) & Subak, the direct interpretation of the traditional record "Byun is Subak, Muheui is wrestling. This is today's Taekkyeon", it directly means "hurrying is Subak (Korean wrestling's goal is takedown & knockdown), gaming is wrestling. This (wrestling) is today's Taekkyeon" in euphemism. Hurrying wrestling's goal with strikes is Subak; Subak became Sibak; Ssireum became Taekkyeon; Taekkyeon has both regular Taekkyeon & Sibak (also Taekkyeon according to medieval encyclopedia Jaemulbo) in Taekkyeon.

Similarity between Subak & Taekkyeon-Yetbub
A direct interview with Dukgi Song was recorded in Munyejinheung by Bohyung Lee, and published in 1984 by Munyejinheungwon on Volume 11 Number 1 page 67 (이보형, 문예진흥 제 11권 1호, 문예진흥원, 1984.2, p. 67, 이보형이 송덕기 옹에게 췌록한 내용). "누상동에는 '장칼'이라는 장사가 있어 키도 크고 힘도 좋고 '복장지르기', '가슴치기'등 택견솜씨가 좋았다." Translation: "Nusangdong had a strongman named Jangkal. He was tall & strong; he was good at Taekyun techniques particularly Bokjangjireugi (Front Stomp Kick), Gaseumchigi (Frontal Chest Slap, slapping chest at front), etc." Dukgi Song testified directly about frontal slap in Taekkyeon. "이보형이 송덕기 옹에게 췌록한 내용". Translation: "the content recorded by Bohyung Lee from direct interview with Dukgi Song."

The same interview and the same book (by Munyejinheungwon & Bohyung Lee, 1984, Munyejinheung Volume 11, Number 1, page 67) included Dukgi Song's direct testimony and how Taekyun Yetbub broke a jaw with one slap to the jaw as well as his testimony on how Taekkyeon had frontal chest slap. There are also online Taekkyeon articles on Taekkyeon Yetbub by the official Taekkyeon organizations. As a side note, slapping cheek is often thought as hitting side, but cheek or jaw is halfway frontal in about 45 degrees, not 90 degrees at side like ears. Also, hook and swing are two different motions; hook isn't used for slapping cheeks. Furthermore, sports create techniques & motions; they evolve & add motions not from everyday-life (explicit proofs have to check such). Also, whether hitting 45 degrees, 0 degrees or 90 degrees from the front, shoulder-push & Yong stacking speed, power, mass doesn't change for hand strike; the strike techniques are the same. Taekyun & Subak techniques are consistent in authenticity. Subak had swing slaps hitting front (frontal slap), straight slaps, punches already at the ancient time; Taekkyeon also had all those in the medieval times already. Straight slaps are also common in everyday-life anyway such as swatting, spanking. There are authoritative explicit proofs for Taekkyeon, Taekkyeon-Yetbub, Subak moves from the older eras by reputable sources.

Similarity between North Korean Gyeoksul and Subak

North Korea has a fight game called Kyuksul. According to historical records referred by Mookas martial art magazine, "the earlier contests were about the same as boxing, but in 1987's 7th contest, it evolved to the level of kickboxing."

Gyuksul was originally from Subak. In the new Gyuksul rules & techniques, Gyuksul also resembles Sibak (Korean street fighting games) & Gwonbeop (Muyedobotongji).

Those 3 pictures are Gyuksul moves. There are similar moves in Korean Muyedobotongji Gwonbeop, except that Gwonbub's wild swing with shoulder-push uses vertical fist while Gyuksul uses horizontal fist. Those 3 pictures resemble these two 300 years old Korean Gwonbeop pictures.

North Korean Gyuksul started from Subak. Then it evolved to be like Sibak & Gwonbeop by the influence of Yoon Byung-in and his art Gwonbeop taught at YMCA, which became a root of Taekwondo. Byungin Yoon's Gwonbeop (different from Karate) is shown by Cheolheui Park's Pasa-Gwonbeop published when he was young. Byungin Yoon's Gwonbeop influenced both Taekwondo & Gyuksul. North Korean Gyeoksul's punch uses horizontal fist swing punch without fist rotation. Gyeoksul doesn't have boxing exclusive motions such as uppercut or hook.

Subak and Shoubo
Subak is the Korean pronunciation, whilst Shoubo is the Chinese pronunciation of the same characters (手搏). They are, however, pronounced differently due to language differences. It is not explicitly limited to Korean or Chinese, but throughout East Asia. 

Shoubo existed in China for many years, but modern Shoubo does not have links to the older Shoubo of China.

In addition to Korean records, Chinese historical records on Shoubo can be used to study Korean Subak to a great extent as they often overlap with each other. On the Chinese Qin Dynasty's comb (archaeological scholarly source), Shoubo's motions were recorded.

Subak having punches

Subak has punches as techniques.

Medieval Chinese book Yongdangsopoom (涌幢小品) recorded Subak is also called Tagwon in 1621. It also recorded Subak had Subub, techniques. "백타(白打)는 곧 수박으로 겨루는 것이다. 당나라 장종(莊宗)은 수박으로 내기를 하였으며, 장경아(張敬兒)는 수박으로 공을 세웠다. 세속에서는 타권(打拳)이라고도 하며, 소주인이 말하길 사람의 뼈를 부러 뜨려 죽음에 이르게 할 수 있다. 빨리 죽이고 천천히 죽이는 것은 오로지 수법(手法)에 달려 있다."

Translation: "Baekta is competing with Subak. Tang's Jangjong gambled with Subak. Jang Gyunga made accomplishments with Subak. Civilians also call Subak as Takwon. Soju people say it can break human's bones to kill. Killing fast or killing slow depends on the (Subeob) techniques." There are also reputable archaeological Subak wall drawings (including frontal slaps) which represent the real life Subak scenes back in the era.

Medieval Korean Royal Journal also describes the rules & motions of Takwon. "유격이 타권의 기법을 앞에서 보여줬다. 그 법은 뛰면서 몸을 날려 두 손으로 자기 얼굴이나 목, 혹은 등을 치며, 가슴과 배를 번갈아치기도 했다. 볼기와 허벅지를 문지르기도 하며, 손을 쓰는 것이 어찌나 빠르고 민첩한지 사람이 감히 그 앞에 접근할 수 없을 정도였다(선조실록 권99, 31년 4월 경신)".

Translation: "Yugyeok showed Tagwon's techniques at the front. The method is leaping the body, with 2 hands, hitting his face, neck & back, hitting chest & stomach. Also rubbing butt & thighs. His hand strikes were fast & agile that a person couldn't go near his front."

"수박과 백타를 막연하게 동일시하고 맨손무예를 의미하는 보통명사들이라는 설(設)이 있으나 적어도 위의 타권인 수박은 고유명사인 것(내용 중에 특징적인 기술체계가 있다). 선조실록(동(同) 시대)에 등장하는 타권과 연장선에서 이해 할 필요가 있다. 백타가 태권도경기라면 수박은 태권도를 말한다. 태권도경기와 태권도를 어떻게 같다 할 수 있겠는가?"

Translation: "There is a theory that Subak & Baekta are ambiguously equal, that they are common nouns for barehand martial arts. However, Tagwon described above is a proper noun (the contents have a unique system of techniques). It should be understood as the extension of Seonjo era's royal Chosun (Korean) journal's Tagwon. If Baekta is Taekwondo sparring, Subak is Taekwondo itself. How can you say Taekwondo competition and Taekwondo are the same?"

The Korean Subak Federation claims that Tagwon & Baekta are different from Subak, and they are a competition method based on Subak. In their claim, Subak would use palms only, but Subak would compete using both punches & slaps for Tagwon & Baekta. However, there are explicit old authentic historical records that Subak itself had punches in the game, not as an extension game of Subak. Like many names of sports & activities such as volleyball, curling, baseball, thunderclap, Subak's name meaning clap has no logical necessity nor proof that it should use palm only nor hit side only. Regardless, Korean Subak Federation agrees that Subak uses punches in Tagwon & Baekta which they claim to be a competition method of Subak. Subak slaps front & side (cheeks), but Subak's application Tagwon punches anyway. Also, there are many reputable & old historical records that Subak itself had punches in the game. In any case, Subak population fought using punches in the application of Subak. The only difference is whether Subak itself had punches or Subak's application & competition had punches. The difference is whether Subak used fist in Tagwon only or also in general Subak.

Difference between Sibak & Subak 
Sibak hits with any body part; Subak uses frontal slap, side slap, punches, knife hand strikes, and grab moving front and back, the hand and fingers bending (Namseon Choi's description).

Chaeho Shin testified that only Songdo (North Korea) had Subak 100 years ago. Chaeho Shin also described that Subak became Gwonbeop in China and Judo in Japan. Subak has relation to both wrestling & also striking martial art. Sibak (Taekkyeon) is a new version of Subak which includes kicking, headbutt, punches, etc.

Medieval Korean encyclopedia also differentiates Taekkyeon & Subak.Taekkyeon uses kicks, which is the main distinction between Subak & Sibak.

References

1941's Murayama Jijun's Baksi & Nanjangbaksi record"
"Chosun Common Sense Q & A, 1937's Subak Newspaper Column"
"North Korea's Songdo city had Subak 100 years ago"

Korean martial arts
Historical martial arts